"Give Me a Chance" is a single recorded by Chinese singer Lay for his solo album Namanana. The song was pre-released on October 5, 2018 by SM Entertainment and Zhang Yixing Studio.

Background and release
On September 28, it was announced that Lay would pre-release his song "Give Me a Chance" on October 5, the lyrics and composing of which were co-written and co-composed by Bazzi, and would release the music video of the song on October 7. On October 5, the track was released.

Written and composed by Lay, Bazzi and others, "Give Me a Chance" is described as having a trap beat over a dreamy melody with lyrics about a former lover.

Music video
On October 5, a teaser of the music video of "Give Me a Chance" was released. On October 7, the music video was officially released.

The music video shows Lay dancing along with backup dancers in an industrial setting and on a rooftop.

Reception
"Give Me a Chance" topped the iTunes charts in 16 countries including Hong Kong, Argentina, Finland, and the United Arab Emirates. The single reached the top three on China's music streaming chart QQ Music.

Charts

Release history

References

2018 songs
2018 singles
SM Entertainment singles
Songs written by Bazzi (singer)
Lay Zhang songs